The Silver River flows from the Slieve Bloom Mountains in the south of County Offaly in central Ireland. The village of Cadamstown, on the river, is the home of The Silver River Geological Reserve.

Course
The Silver rises on the northwestern slopes of Baureigh Mountain (486 m) and descends to Cadamstown, the first settlement it encounters. Flowing westwards it passes Ballyboy and Kilcormac before turning north to join the River Brosna near Ferbane. The Brosna flows west from the confluence to join the River Shannon at Shannon Harbour.

The Silver River is contained mostly within County Offaly but flows briefly within County Westmeath.

Rivers of County Offaly